Tenthredo atra  is a Palearctic species of  sawfly. It is a pollinator of the plant Euphorbia serrata.

References

External links
The sawflies (Symphyta) of Britain and Ireland

Hymenoptera of Europe
Tenthredinidae
Sawflies described in 1758
Taxa named by Carl Linnaeus
Palearctic insects